Seenplatte is a Verwaltungsgemeinschaft ("collective municipality") in the district Saale-Orla-Kreis, in Thuringia, Germany. The seat of the Verwaltungsgemeinschaft is in Oettersdorf.

The Verwaltungsgemeinschaft Seenplatte consists of fourteen municipalities:

Dittersdorf 
Görkwitz 
Göschitz 
Kirschkau 
Löhma 
Moßbach 
Neundorf bei Schleiz 
Oettersdorf
Plothen 
Pörmitz 
Tegau 
Volkmannsdorf

References

Verwaltungsgemeinschaften in Thuringia